Worston is a civil parish in Ribble Valley, Lancashire, England.  It contains three listed buildings that are recorded in the National Heritage List for England.  All of the listed buildings are designated at Grade II, the lowest of the three grades, which is applied to "buildings of national importance and special interest".  The parish include the small village of Worston and surrounding countryside.  The listed buildings consist of two houses and a garden wall.

Buildings

References

Citations

Sources

Lists of listed buildings in Lancashire
Buildings and structures in Ribble Valley